Benjamin "Ben" Rothwell, Jr. (September 14, 1902 – December 14, 1979) was an American boxer who competed in the 1924 Summer Olympics. He was born in West Point, Virginia and died in Short Hills, New Jersey. In 1924 he was eliminated in the quarter-finals of the lightweight class after losing his fight to the eventual silver medalist Alfredo Copello of Argentina.

Professional boxing record

References

External links
Ben Rothwell's profile at Sports Reference.com

1902 births
1979 deaths
People from West Point, Virginia
Boxers from Virginia
Lightweight boxers
Olympic boxers of the United States
Boxers at the 1924 Summer Olympics
American male boxers